Ras-related protein Rab-6A is a protein that in humans is encoded by the RAB6A gene located in the eleventh chromosome. Its main function is the regulation of protein transport from the Golgi complex to the endoplasmic reticulum and the exocytosis along with the microtubules.

Interactions
RAB6A has been shown to interact with:
 BICD1,
 DCTN1 
 ERC1,  and
 KIF20A.

References

Further reading